This is a list of waterways that form the Atlantic Intracoastal Waterway, sometimes called the Intracoastal Canal, and crossings (bridges, tunnels and ferries) of it.

Florida
 Florida Bay
 Baker Cut (manmade)
 Buttonwood Sound
 Grouper Creek
 Tarpon Basin
 Dusenberg Creek
 Blackwater Sound
 Jewfish Creek
 Jewfish Creek Bridge (U.S. 1 (SR 5))
 Barnes Sound
 Little Card Sound
 Card Sound Bridge
 Card Sound
 Biscayne Bay
 Rickenbacker Causeway (north approach is SR 913)
 Dodge Island Bridge (SR 886)
 MacArthur Causeway (SR A1A)
 Venetian Causeway
 Julia Tuttle Causeway (I-195 (SR 112))
 John F. Kennedy Causeway (SR 934)
 Broad Causeway (SR 922)
 Biscayne Creek
 Sunny Isles Causeway (SR 826)
 Dumfoundling Bay
 Man-made canal
 William Lehman Causeway (SR 856)
 Hallandale Beach Bridge (SR 858)
 SR 820
 SR 822
 SR A1A
 Stranahan River
 17th Street Causeway (SR A1A)
 New River
 New River Sound
 SR 842
 Middle River
 Man-made canal
 SR 838
 SR 816
 SR 870
 SR 814
 SR 844
 Hillsboro River
 SR 810 (Hillsboro Blvd.)
 Man-made canal (Hillsboro Canal branches off it)
 El Camino Real
 Lake Boca Raton
 Palmetto Park Road (CR 798)
 Man-made canal?
 Lake Wyman
 Lake Rogers
 SR 800
 Man-made canal
 Linton Boulevard (CR 782)
 SR 806
 George Bush Boulevard (CR 806A)
 Southeast 15th Avenue (CR 792)
 SR 804
 Lake Worth
 Lantana Bridge (Ocean Avenue)
 Harris Bridge (Florida) (SR 802)
 Southern Boulevard Bridge (US 98 / SR 80)
 Royal Palm Bridge (SR 704)
 Flagler Memorial Bridge (SR A1A)
 Riviera Beach Bridge (SR A1A)
 Lake Worth Creek
 U.S. 1 (SR 5)
 SR 786
 Donald Ross Road
 SR 706
 Loxahatchee River
 U.S. 1 (SR 5)
 Jupiter Sound
 CR 707

 Hobe Sound
 Jupiter Narrows
 CR 707
 Peck Lake
 Man-made canal
 Great Pocket
 Indian River
 SR A1A
 Frank A. Wacha Bridge (SR 732)
 South Causeway Bridge (SR A1A)
 North Causeway Bridge (SR A1A)
 17th Street Causeway (SR 656)
 Merrill P. Barber Bridge (SR 60)
 Wabasso Causeway (SR 510)
 Ernest Kouwen-Hoven Bridge (Melbourne Causeway) (US 192 (SR 500))
 Eau Gallie Bridge (Eau Gallie Causeway) (SR 518)
 Pineda Bridge (Pineda Causeway) (SR 404)
 Hubert H. Humphrey Bridge (Merritt Island Causeway) (SR 520)
 Emory L. Bennett Causeway (SR 528)
 NASA Parkway (SR 405)
 A. Maxwell Brewer Memorial Causeway (CR 402)
 U.S. Government Railroad
 Haulover Canal (manmade)
 Former SR 3
 Indian River North
 Mosquito Lagoon
 South Causeway (New Smyrna Beach) (SR A1A)
 North Causeway (New Smyrna Beach) (SR 44) 
 Ponce de Leon Cut (manmade)
 Halifax River
 Port Orange Causeway (William V. Chappell Jr. Memorial Bridge or Dunlawton Bridge) (SR A1A)
 Veterans Memorial Bridge (CR 4050)
 Broadway Bridge (US 92 and SR 600)
 Main Street Bridge (CR 4040)
 Seabreeze Bridge (SR 430)
 Granada Bridge (SR 40)
 Halifax Creek
 Smith Creek
 Knox Memorial Bridge
 SR 100
 Man-made canal
 Fox Cut (manmade)
 Man-made canal
 Palm Coast Parkway
 Matanzas River
 SR 206
 SR 312
 Bridge of Lions (SR A1A)
 Tolomato River
 Vilano Beach Bridge (SR A1A)
 Man-made canal
 Tolomato River
 Man-made canal
 Palm Valley Bridge (CR 210)
 Pablo Creek
 SR 202 "Butler Blvd"
 McCormick Bridge (US 90 "Beach Blvd." (SR 212))
 SR 10 "Atlantic Blvd."
 SR 116 "Wonderwood Bridge"
 Sisters Creek
 SR 105
 Gunnison Cut (manmade)
 Sawpit Creek
 Man-made canal
 South Amelia River
 Man-made canal
 Kingsley Creek
 SR A1A/SR 200
 Amelia River
 Cumberland Sound Florida/Georgia state line

Georgia
 Cumberland Sound – USGS Feature Detail Report
Passenger ferry between St Marys and Cumberland Island
 Cumberland Dividings – USGS Feature Detail Report
 Cumberland River – USGS Feature Detail Report
 St. Andrew Sound – USGS Feature Detail Report
 Jekyll Sound – USGS Feature Detail Report
 Jekyll Creek (Jekyll River) – USGS Feature Detail Report
 Jekyll Island Causeway, M. E. Thompson Bridge
 Brunswick River – USGS Feature Detail Report
 Saint Simons Sound – USGS Feature Detail Report
 Manhead Sound – USGS Feature Detail Report
 Mackay River – USGS Feature Detail Report
 F. J. Torras Causeway 
 Buttermilk Sound – USGS Feature Detail Report
 Altamaha Sound – USGS Feature Detail Report
 Little Mud River – USGS Feature Detail Report
 Back River (Georgia) – USGS Feature Detail Report
 North River – USGS Feature Detail Report
 Doboy Sound – USGS Feature Detail Report
 Old Teakettle Creek – USGS Feature Detail Report
 Crescent River – USGS Feature Detail Report
 Creighton Narrows – USGS Feature Detail Report
 Front River – USGS Feature Detail Report
 Sapelo River – USGS Feature Detail Report
 Sapelo Sound – USGS Feature Detail Report
 South Newport River – USGS Feature Detail Report
 Johnson Creek
 North Newport River – USGS Feature Detail Report
 Saint Catherines Sound – USGS Feature Detail Report
 Bear River
 Florida Passage – USGS Feature Detail Report
 Ogeechee River
 Hell Gate – USGS Feature Detail Report
 Ossabaw Sound – USGS Feature Detail Report
 Green Island Sound – USGS Feature Detail Report
 Vernon River – USGS Feature Detail Report
 Moon River
 Skidaway Narrows – USGS Feature Detail Report
 Skidaway River – USGS Feature Detail Report
 Wilmington River – USGS Feature Detail Report
 Saint Augustine Creek – USGS Feature Detail Report
 Elba Island Cut – USGS Feature Detail Report
 South Channel Savannah River – USGS Feature Detail Report
 Savannah River

South Carolina
In South Carolina, the waterway is made of numerous natural and manmade waterways that wind among the sea islands. The Pine Island cut is the longest manmade section of the entire waterway. It was the last section of the waterway to be completed and was dedicated on April 11, 1936.

 Savannah River
 Fields Cut
 Wright River
 Watts Cut
 New River
 Ramshorn Creek
 Calibogue Sound
 Skull Creek
 Fixed span to Hilton Head Island
 Port Royal Sound
 Beaufort River
 Ladys Island Swing Bridge
 Brickyard Creek
 Coosaw River
 Ashepoo Coosaw Cutoff
 Rock Creek
 Ashepoo Coosaw Cutoff
 Ashepoo River
 Fenwick Cut
 South Edisto River
 Watts Cut
 North Creek
 Dawhoo River
 McKinley Washington, Jr. Bridge (fixed span)
 Wadmalaw River
 Church Flats
 Stono River
John F. Limehouse Memorial Bridge (fixed span)
 Elliott Cut
 Wappoo Creek
 Wappoo Creek Bridge
 Cooper River (Charleston County, South Carolina)
 Charleston Harbor
 Jeanette Creek
 Sullivans Narrows
Ben Sawyer Bridge (swing span)
 Meeting Reach
Isle of Palms Connector Bridge (fixed span)
 Seven Reaches
 Copahee Sound
 Capers Creek
 Price Creek
 Seewee Bay
 manmade canal
 Graham Creek
 Awendaw Creek
 Harbor River
 Mathews Cut
 Casino Creek
 Fourmile Creek Canal (crosses South Santee River)
 North Santee River
 Estherville Minim Creek Canal
 South Island Ferry
 Winyah Bay
 Waccamaw River
 L. W. Siau Bridge (fixed span)
 Socastee Creek
 Benjamin Thrailkill Bridge (fixed span)
 Socastee Swing Bridge (Dick Pond Road)
 Pine Island cut (manmade canal, approximately 24 miles long)
 US 501, Black Skimmer Trail (fixed span)
 Pine Island bascule bridge, originally built as a combination rail and vehicle span
 Robert M. Grissom Parkway (fixed span)
 Grande Dunes Boulevard (fixed span)
 S.C. 22/Future I-73 (fixed spans)
 Barefoot Resort Bridge (swing bridge)
 Little River
 Little River swing bridge
  (fixed span)

North Carolina
 manmade canal
 Sunset Boulevard (Sunset Beach)
  (Ocean Isle Beach)
 Shallotte River
 manmade canal
  (Holden Beach)
 Lockwoods Folly River
 manmade canal
 (Future Second Oak Island crossing)
 
 
 
 Cape Fear River
 manmade canal
 
 Masonboro Sound
 
 Middle Sound
 Topsail Sound
 
 Stump Sound
 
 New River
 White Oak River
 Bogue Sound
 
 Bay View Road
 Newport River
 
 manmade canal

 Adams Creek
 Neuse River
 Pamlico Sound
 manmade canal
 
 Goose Creek
 Pamlico River
 Pungo River
 manmade canal
 
 
 Alligator River
 
 Albemarle Sound
 North River
 Great Swamp
 manmade canal
 
 Currituck Sound
 North Landing River

Virginia
 North Landing River
 Pungo Ferry Road
 VA 165
 manmade canal
 Centerville Turnpike
 VA 168/Chesapeake Expressway
 South Branch Elizabeth River
 VA 168 Business/Battlefield Boulevard
 US 17/Dominion Boulevard
 High Rise Bridge (I-64/Hampton Roads Beltway)
 Gilmerton Bridge (US 13/US 460/Military Highway)
 Jordan Bridge (VA 337)
 Downtown Tunnel (I-264/US 460 Alternate) 
 Elizabeth River
 Midtown Tunnel (US 58)
 Hampton Roads
 James River
 Hampton Roads Bridge–Tunnel (I-64/Hampton Roads Beltway)

Maryland
Chesapeake Bay
Chesapeake Bay Bridge (US 50 / US 301)
Chesapeake and Delaware Canal
Chesapeake City Bridge (MD 213)

Delaware
Chesapeake and Delaware Canal
Summit Bridge (DE 71 / DE 896)
Chesapeake & Delaware Canal Lift Bridge (Delmarva Central Railroad)
Senator William V. Roth Jr. Bridge (DE 1)
St. Georges Bridge (US 13)
Reedy Point Bridge (DE 9)
Delaware Bay

New Jersey
Cape May Canal
Route 162
Route 109
Middle Thorofare Bridge (CR 621 (Ocean Drive))
Jarvis Sound
George Reading Wildwood Bridge (Route 47)
Grassy Sound
Route 147
Grassy Sound Bridge (CR 619 (Ocean Drive))
Great Channel
Stone Harbor Bridge (CR 657 (Stone Harbor Blvd))
Great Sound
CR 601 (Avalon Blvd)
Ingrams Thorofare
Townsend Channel
Ludlam Thoroughfare
CR 625 (Sea Isle Blvd)
Ludlam Bay
Crook Horn Creek
34th Street Bridge (CR 623)
Peck Bay
Great Egg Harbor
Howard S. Stainton Memorial Causeway/Ninth Street Bridge (Route 52)
Risley Channel
John F. Kennedy Memorial Bridge (Route 152)
Downbeach Express (CR 563)
Lake's Bay
West Canal
Inside Thorofare
US 40/US 322
Atlantic City Expressway
US 30
Clam Thorofare
Reed's Bay
Little Bay
Great Bay
Little Egg Harbor
Manahawkin Bay Bridge (Route 72)
Manahawkin Bay
Barnegat Bay
Thomas A. Mathis and J. Stanley Tunney Bridges (Route 37)
CR 528 (Mantoloking Rd)
Point Pleasant Canal
Lovelandtown Bridge (Route 13)
Route 88
Manasquan River

New York

 The New York State Canal System is part of the Intracoastal Waterway
 East River
 Long Island Sound
 Bronx-Whitestone Bridge
 Throgs Neck Bridge

Connecticut
 Long Island Sound
 Bridgeport-Port Jefferson Ferry
 Cross Sound Ferry

Rhode Island
 Block Island Sound
 Rhode Island Sound

Massachusetts
 Buzzards Bay
 Cape Cod Canal
 Cape Cod Canal Railroad Bridge
 Bourne Bridge – Route 28
 Sagamore Bridge – U.S. Route 6
 Cape Cod Bay
 Massachusetts Bay
Annisquam River
 Blynman Canal Bridge
 Gloucester Railroad Bridge
 Route 128

New Hampshire
 Piscataqua River – mouth forms harbor

Maine
 Gulf of Maine
 Casco Bay
 Penobscot Bay

References

2. Cruiser Net – http://www.cruisersnet.net/index.php?categoryid=65

See also
Waterways forming and crossings of the Gulf Intracoastal Waterway

Atlantic Intracoastal Waterway
Atlantic
Atlantic Intracoastal Waterway